UP Health System - Portage is a hospital and associated healthcare system based in the Keweenaw Peninsula of Michigan. The healthcare system has several clinics stretching as far north as Lake Linden, Michigan and as far south as offices in L'Anse, Michigan and Ontonagon, Michigan. The system's main building is a 36-bed hospital in Hancock, Michigan. The Portage Health Hospital employs more than 800 people, and is the second largest employer in Houghton County, behind Michigan Technological University. The hospital is one of two in the state of Michigan to be recognized as a Level III trauma center by the American College of Surgeons.

Services

Inpatient Services
 Family Birthing Center
 Elderly/disabled (Intermediate nursing care)
 End-of-life services (Hospice, Pain management and Palliative care)
 Hospitalists
 Infection isolation room
 Cancer services

Outpatient Services
 Breast cancer screening/mammograms
 Certified trauma center
 Chemotherapy
 Fitness center
 Geriatric services
 Home health services
 Kidney dialysis
 Physical rehabilitation
 Sleep center
 Stop-smoking program
 Sports medicine
 Urgent-care center
 Women's health
 Wound management services
 Patient/Family Support Services

Ambulance Services
 Help with government services
 Chaplaincy/pastoral care services
 Cancer services
 Patient support groups
 Patient representative/ombudsman
 Transportation for elderly/handicapped
 Translation services

Facilities 
 Portage Health - Hancock
 Portage Health University Center
 Portage Health - Houghton
 Portage Health - Lake Linden
 Portage Health - Ontonagon

History 

Portage Health was founded in 1896 as St. Joseph's Hospital in Hancock, Michigan. It was set up in Bishop John Vertin's home, and stayed there until 1904 when St. Joseph's Hospital opened in a new building on Water Street. The hospital received accreditation by the American College of Surgeons in 1924, becoming the first Copper Country hospital to become accredited, and one of just 14 in the state at the time. In 1949, the hospital began building a new building on Michigan Avenue. In 1972 St. Joseph's Hospital became St. Joseph's Community Hospital. In 1976 the Sisters of St. Joseph of Carondelet transferred ownership to the community, and the name was changed to Portage View Hospital. In 1995 the name was changed, this time to Portage Health System, and in 2000 the hospital moved to its current building on Campus Drive in Hancock.

References

External links 
 Portage Health's Official Website

Keweenaw County, Michigan
Trauma centers
Hospitals in Michigan